Protolithocolletis lathyri is a moth of the family Gracillariidae. It is known from California and Michigan in the United States and from British Columbia east to Manitoba in Canada.

The larvae feed on Lathyrus venosus and Lathyrus japonicus. They mine the leaves of their host plant. The mine is tentiform partially folding the leaflet.

References

Lithocolletinae

Leaf miners
Taxa named by Annette Frances Braun
Moths of North America
Lepidoptera of the United States
Lepidoptera of Canada
Moths described in 1929